Northsbest is the debut studio album by American rapper Lil Mosey. It was released on October 19, 2018, by Mogul Vision Music and Interscope Records. It is his major label debut, and shares the same name as his 2017 mixtape NorthsBest. The album was preceded by four singles: "Pull Up", "Boof Pack", "Noticed" and "Yoppa". All eleven tracks were produced by Royce David except for "Pull Up", while "Yoppa" is the only song containing a guest appearance, with BlocBoy JB appearing on the track.  Northsbest peaked at number 29 on the US Billboard 200. In addition, "Noticed" was a huge commercial success, going on to become one of Mosey's most popular songs to date.

The album was re-released in mid-2019 as Northsbest (Extended), with the addition of the March 2019 single "Bust Down Cartier", which was produced by Mosey himself.

Background
On August 9, 2018, in an interview with XXL, it was revealed that Lil Mosey was working on a studio album that served as the successor to his 2017 mixtape of the same name, slated for release in Fall 2018. On October 15, 2018, Mosey posted a teaser for the album on his Instagram account. On October 17, he revealed the album's release date; the album was released two days later on October 19, 2018.

Critical reception

Northsbest received generally positive reviews from critics. At the music website HotNewHipHop, the album received an average score of 4.3 out of 5 stars (87%), based on 23 reviews.

Track listing
All tracks produced by Royce David, except where noted. Credits adapted from Tidal.

Notes
 "Kamikaze" is known as "Kamakaze" on the clean version of the album.
 "Greet Her" contains sampled elements from "Yo (Excuse Me Miss)" by Chris Brown.

Charts

Weekly charts

Year-end charts

Certifications

Notes

References

2018 debut albums
Lil Mosey albums
Interscope Records albums